Barbara "Bobo" Sears Rockefeller (September 6, 1916 – May 19, 2008), also known by her stage name Eva Paul, was an American actress.

Early life and career
Bobo was born in 6 September 1916 as Jievute Paulekiute (Lithuanian: Jievutė Paulekiūtė) to a family of Lithuanian origin. She spent her childhood in Chicago. Later, her family moved to Indiana. At the age of 17, she became Miss Lithuania. For her education, she attended Northwestern University.

She also held the position of third secretary at the U.S. embassy in Paris. She was also featured on Time'''s cover.

Personal
She married Winthrop Rockefeller on February 14, 1948 in a small, private ceremony attended by less than 10 people, including best man Laurence Rockefeller and maid of honor Isabel Paul. She divorced Rockefeller in 1954, reporting they had already been separated for four years and following what newspapers described as a "fierce legal battle", she won custody of her son and a $5.5 million settlement. She later had a brief engagement to hotelier Charles W. Mapes in 1962. Her son, Winthrop Paul Rockefeller, a former lieutenant governor of Arkansas, died in 2006.

She died on May 19, 2008 in Little Rock, Arkansas.

Filmography
 Tobacco Road (1941)
 That Night with You (1945)
 Bad Men of the Border (1945)
 Code of the Lawless (1945)
 The Road to Total War (1983)
 Goodbye War (1983)
 The Relationship'' (1988)

References

1916 births
2008 deaths
American actresses
American people of Lithuanian descent
Rockefeller family